Ubaldo Terzano is an Italian cinematographer and camera operator, possibly best known for his numerous collaborations with Mario Bava.

As a cinematographer, his film credits include Bava's Black Sabbath (1963), The Whip and the Body (1963), and Blood and Black Lace (1964).

Terzano and Bava reputedly had a falling out in 1964. Mario Bava biographer has stated in his audio commentary that Terzano refused to be interviewed.

As a camera operator, he worked on such films as Bava's Black Sunday (1960), Elio Petri's Investigation of a Citizen Above Suspicion (1970), Lucio Fulci's A Lizard in a Woman's Skin (1971), Paul Morrissey's Flesh for Frankenstein (1973) and Blood for Dracula (1974), and Dario Argento's Deep Red (1975), among many other titles.

References

External links
 

Italian cinematographers
Living people
Year of birth missing (living people)